Kabudeh-ye Abu ol Vafai (also Romanized as Kabūdeh-ye Abū ol Vafā'ī and Kabūd-e Abū ol Vafā) is a village in Gol Gol Rural District, in the Central District of Kuhdasht County, Lorestan Province, Iran. At the 2006 census, its population was 1,184, in 253 families.

References 

Towns and villages in Kuhdasht County